Michael W. Goodwin (b. October 9, 1941, in Virginia, Minnesota) is an American character actor. He has appeared in a number of Aaron Spelling-produced television programs, and a number of films which take place during the American Civil War.

Goodwin appeared as recurring character Scott Bradley on the soap opera Another World in the late 1970s. 

Shortly thereafter, he did theatre in his native Minnesota, appearing in Friedrich Schiller's verse play, Mary Stuart, at the Guthrie Theater, Minneapolis, with Barbara Bryne in the cast.  He also appeared in George Bernard Shaw's play, Arms and the Man at the Guthrie, directed by Michael Langham.

He starred in the television series Strike Force (1981–1982, produced by Aaron Spelling) and The Hamptons (1983). He guest-starred on such Aaron Spelling productions as Charlie's Angels, The Love Boat, Matt Houston, Dynasty, Finder of Lost Loves, and Sizzle.

In 2012–2014, he was cast in small roles in a number of films centered around the Civil War: Steven Spielberg's Lincoln, the TV film Killing Lincoln, 2014's Freedom, and 2014's Field of Lost Shoes.

Filmography

References

External links 

1941 births
20th-century American male actors
21st-century American male actors
Male actors from Minnesota
American male actors
American male film actors
American male television actors
Living people